Ciekoty  is a village in the administrative district of Gmina Masłów, within Kielce County, Świętokrzyskie Voivodeship, in south-central Poland. Geographically, it lies near the base of Mount Radostowa in the Łysogóry range of the Świętokrzyskie Mountains.

The village has a population of 361.

References

Ciekoty